Beverly Archer is an American actress who is perhaps best known for her television roles as Iola Boylen on Mama's Family and as Gunnery Sgt. Alva Bricker on Major Dad.

Career 
In addition to her roles as a regular member of the cast on Mama's Family and Major Dad, Archer has  appeared on a number of other programs, including The Young and the Restless, ALF, and the movie Project: ALF. She played a thieving teacher in The Brady Bunch Movie and appeared in two episodes of Married... with Children as Miss Hardaway, a sexually repressed librarian and abstinence counselor who is in love with Bud. 

She also appeared in a 1994 episode of Full House, where she played the role of an unsympathetic SAT test monitor. She made guest appearances on episodes of Grace Under Fire, Family Ties and The Fall Guy. She portrayed Nancy Walker's daughter in The Nancy Walker Show. Aside from acting, Archer wrote episodes for both Mama's Family and ALF.

Archer appeared in a 1987 episode of Rosie, where she played the role of Kate Boston the former student at Peachtree Academy. In addition to acting, Archer also wrote three ALF episodes.

She retired from acting in 2002.

References

External links

Living people
American film actresses
American soap opera actresses
American television writers
American women television writers
Actresses from California
San Francisco State University alumni
University of California, Santa Barbara alumni
20th-century American actresses
21st-century American women
Year of birth missing (living people)